Lorenzo Meazzi (born 28 May 2001) is an Italian professional footballer who plays as a midfielder for  club Virtus Entella.

Career
Born in Genoa, Meazzi started his career in Virtus Entella youth sector. He was promoted to first team in 2020–21 season.

Meazzi made his professional debut in Serie B on 10 April 2021 against Salernitana as a late substitute.

References

External links
 
 

2001 births
Living people
Footballers from Genoa
Italian footballers
Association football midfielders
Serie B players
Serie C players
Virtus Entella players